World Schools Style debating (or WSS) is a combination of the British Parliamentary and Australia-Asian debating formats, designed to meet the needs of the World Schools Debating Championships tournament. Each debate comprises eight speeches delivered by two teams of three members, representing the Proposition and Opposition sides. The first six speeches are eight minutes in duration, with each team then finishing up by giving a four-minute concluding reply speech. Teams are given 30 to 60 minutes to prepare for their speeches.

Speaking order

First speaker of the Proposition
First speaker of the Opposition
Second speaker of the Proposition
Second speaker of the Opposition
Third speaker of the Proposition
Third speaker of the Opposition
Reply speaker of the Opposition
Reply speaker of the Proposition

Role of each speaker

First speaker of the Proposition

The role of the first speaker is to open up the case of the proposition. That means they present their side's opinion and arguments. Furthermore, they give a definition of that motion, in order to prevent any confusion caused by the motion, which might lack clarity. The first speaker also sometimes gives a status quo or an analysis of the current situation regarding that issue (mostly in policy-debates) to show the problem the side Proposition wants to solve, or the situation the side wants to improve et cetera. The first speaker may also give
the case to show their aim of supporting the given resolution.

First speaker of the Opposition

Their duty is to rebut the arguments given by the Proposition, meaning to show why it isn't or can't be true what the other side claimed. They can either give a counter-case regarding that motion or just decide to try to argue against the motion. When arguing against the motion, it is optional to give own arguments, as it would be sufficient to just rebut the arguments or the case well enough; however, giving own arguments is the more common choice.

Second speaker (Opposition or Proposition)

Their role is to rebut the arguments given by the other side and respond to the rebuttal given by the other side. Eventually, they can continue with their team's case and give more arguments if they choose so.

Third Speaker (Opposition or Proposition)

The third speaker has to re-structure the whole debate, filter the key issues of the debate and give a rebuttal. As this position is also called the "rebuttal speaker", their main objective is to prove the other team wrong. They should preferably deepen the analysis of the rebuttal. Good third speakers also point out strategic mistakes such as inconsistencies on the other side. A good third speaker also does case rebuild in the end. There they go into the rebuttal of the other side and show why the rebuttal was wrong or didn't touch their own arguments.

Reply speeches

World Schools Style debates include an additional speech from each team, called the reply speech (sometimes known as the "right of reply"). This is a short, four-minute speech given by either the first or second speaker from the team, and presented in the opposite speaking order to the rest of the debate (i.e. the Opposition deliver the first reply speech, followed by the Proposition). The roles of the reply speech are to:

 Outline one or more points of contention that the debate has centred on;
 Evaluate the course of the debate;
 Declare the reasoning of their team's victory.

The reply speech is sometimes referred to as being a "biased adjudication" of the debate, because its format is similar to that of an adjudicator's oral feedback on the debate, but with the purpose of convincing the audience that the speaker's team was victorious. The retrospective nature of the reply speech means that no new material may be introduced in this speech.

Points of information
During any speech except the reply speeches, and not during the first and last minutes of the first six speeches, members of the opposing team may offer points of information to briefly interject a point that the speaker must immediately respond to. The speaker holding the Floor is not obliged to accept all the points of information offered to them, but is likely to be marked down by adjudicators if they do not accept any. Speakers delivering points of information are expected to keep them to 15 seconds or less. Although a speaker's points of information do not have a direct effect on their mark, a mechanism named the "POI Adjuster" has been introduced in recent years: when the quality of a speaker's POIs is significantly different (better or worse) from the quality of their speech, the judge may add or subtract one or two marks from their overall speaker score.

The first and last minute of each main speech, as well as the entire duration of reply speeches, are "protected time", meaning that no points of information may be offered.

Variations

The World Schools Style of debating is used not only at the World Schools Debating Championships, but also at a number of national and regional high school-level debating competitions around the world. At some of these tournaments, the format is varied slightly. For example, at some competitions, the length of speeches is reduced to five or six minutes for main speeches and three minutes for reply speeches. Some tournaments intended for novice-level debaters also do not allow Points of Information.

In the early years of the World Schools Debating Championships, there was a two-minute break between the main speeches and the reply speeches to allow the team members to confer, though this is no longer the case. However, some national or regional World Schools Style tournaments still have this two-minute break, and in some cases members of the team's squad for the competition who do not speak in the debate are allowed to come out of the audience to confer with the speakers during these two minutes.

See also
Debate
Heart of Europe Debating Tournament
Parliamentary debate
World Schools Debating Championships
World School Resources

External links
Heart of Europe International Debating Tournament website
World Schools Debating Championships website

Debating